Fujin is a county-level city in the east of Heilongjiang province, People's Republic of China. It is under the jurisdiction of the prefecture-level city of Jiamusi.

Administrative divisions 
Fujin City is divided into 2 subdistricts and 11 towns. 
2 subdistricts
 Chengdong, Chengxi
11 towns
 Fujin, Chang'an, Yanshan, Toulin, Xinglonggang, Hongsheng, Xiangyangchuan, Erlongshan, Shangjieji, Jinshan, Dayushu

Demographics 

31163-013: Wind Power Development Project: The scope of the Project comprises (i) construction of wind farms at Dabancheng in the Xinjiang Autonomous Region (30 MW); at Fujin in Heilongjiang Province (24 MW); and at Xiwaizi in Liaoning Province (24 MW); and (ii) technical assistance for Barrier Removal and Institutional Strengthening to promote wind-based power generation in the three provinces.
http://adb.org/projects/31163-013/details

Climate
Fujin has a humid continental climate (Köppen Dwa), with long, bitterly cold, but dry winters, and humid, very warm summers. Close to three-fifths of the annual precipitation falls from June to August. With monthly percent possible sunshine ranging from 46% in the three summer months to 70% in February, there are 2,408 hours of bright sunshine annually.

Notes and references

See also

External links
  Government site - 

Fujin
Cities in Heilongjiang